Halolimnohelix is a genus of air-breathing land snails, terrestrial pulmonate gastropod mollusks in the family Halolimnohelicidae.

Species
Species within the genus Halolimnohelix include:
 Halolimnohelix bukobae (von Martens, 1895)
 Halolimnohelix conradti (von Martens, 1895)
 Halolimnohelix percivali (Preston, 1914)

References

Hygromiidae
Taxonomy articles created by Polbot